Tales of Superstition and Chivalry was an illustrated Gothic ballad collection written by Anne Bannerman. It was published anonymously by Vernor and Hood in 1802, two years after her first volume, Poems. The reviews of Tales were not as favorable as for the earlier production, thought it is often now considered her strongest work. In 1807, the two collections were combined, revised, and re-printed as Poems, a New Edition. The illustrations were handled by Thomas Park.

Literary criticism
The Poetical Register, and Repository of Fugitive Poetry (1802):—

The British Critic (1803-01):—

References

Attribution

Bibliography

External links
 Tales of Superstition and Chivalry at Internet Archive

1802 books
Scottish ballads
19th-century ballads
Gothic fiction